Pitcher Store, also known as Craghead Store, is a historic commercial building located at Fulton, Callaway County, Missouri.  It was built in three stages between 1888 and 1905.  It is an irregular shaped, frame and log combination vernacular building served as a general store, post office and residence.

It was listed on the National Register of Historic Places in 2001.

References 

Commercial buildings on the National Register of Historic Places in Missouri
1888 establishments in Missouri
Buildings and structures in Callaway County, Missouri
National Register of Historic Places in Callaway County, Missouri